Jacques Moeschal (6 September 1900 – 30 October 1956) was a Belgian international footballer who participated at the 1928 Summer Olympics and the 1930 FIFA World Cup.

References

External links
 
 

 

1900 births
1956 deaths
Belgian footballers
Belgium international footballers
Olympic footballers of Belgium
Footballers at the 1928 Summer Olympics
1930 FIFA World Cup players
K.F.C. Rhodienne-De Hoek players
People from Uccle
Association football forwards
Footballers from Brussels